The 1957–58 season was Port Vale's 46th season of football in the English Football League, and their first full season (eighth overall) back in the Third Division South following their relegation from the Second Division. An unusual season, the regional split was to be abolished at the season's end, meaning the bottom two clubs of the Second Division and the clubs placed 2nd to 12th in the Third Division North and the Third Division South would be the founder members of the Third Division. It also meant that the bottom twelve clubs of the Third Division North and the Third Division South would be the founder members of the Fourth Division. In effect, the team's performance in this season could see them placed in either the second, third or fourth tier the following season. Finishing in fifteenth, what would have otherwise been a mid-table finish of little consequence saw them relegated to the Fourth Division.

Overview

Third Division South
The pre-season saw manager Norman Low sign a number of young new players to replace those released at the end of the previous season, saying his team would 'fight like hell to get back into the Second Division'. Four of these signings were: impressive forward Jack Wilkinson (Sheffield United); Welsh international goalkeeper Keith Jones (signed from Aston Villa for £3,500); defender Bert Carberry (Gillingham); and Alan Martin – who returned to the club as a part-time professional.

The season opened with a 1–0 win over Aldershot at the Recreation Ground. This started a sequence of just four defeats in seventeen games, which included doing the double over Southampton (a 3–0 win at The Dell followed by a 4–0 win at Vale Park). This was achieved with Low's attacking policy, a stark contract to 'the Steele Curtain' defence. However their five clean sheets in their first eight games also illustrated their defensive strength. In September, right-half Selwyn Whalley turned part-time, dividing his duties between playing football and teaching at Hanley High School. Winger Alan Bennett was also transferred to Crewe Alexandra. By November, Vale were third in the league, and Low signed Bert Carberry and Jack Wilkinson. Following this top-scorer Stan Steele went off the boil, as the Vale lost their form in the Christmas period, losing 1–0 twice to Coventry City in two days. Though before this a 6–1 victory was recorded over Aldershot.

In January, Ken Griffiths was sold to Mansfield Town for a four-figure fee, having mostly languished in the reserves. By February, Vale were in seventh position, only four points off top spot (with three games in hand) despite their loss of form. Four straight defeats dragged them down towards the bottom half of the table. They bought former Wales international Noel Kinsey from Birmingham City for £5,000 in an attempt to bolster their form. He helped the club achieve a 5–0 win over Watford on 8 March, scoring two goals. Though as injuries developed the club's form again declined, and the team lost eight of their final twelve games. Two points from their final six games doomed them to the fourth tier.

They finished in fifteenth position with 42 points from 46 games. Five points away from the top half of the table, their 'remarkable decline' continued with a second relegation in two years. Their 58 goals conceded was a respectable total, as was their 67 goals scored. Stan Steele, Jack Wilkinson, and Harry Poole all proved themselves consistent goalscorers, scoring 22, 19, and 16 goals respectively.

Finances
On the financial side, a decline in average attendance by around 3,500 left the club with an average gate of 10,457. Gate receipts were down to £33,800, however a small staff helped to make a profit of £145 despite player wages rising to £24,158. Five players were released in the summer, most notably Bert Carberry (Exeter City) and Bill Cleary (King's Lynn). Low also sold Colin Askey to Walsall for 'a fairly substantial fee' and Basil Hayward to Portsmouth for 'a fair fee'.

Cup competitions
In the FA Cup, Vale narrowly defeated Shrewsbury Town with two goals from Wilkinson. Third Division North Hull City knocked the Vale out in the Second Round however, winning the replay 4–3 at Boothferry Park.

League table

Results
Port Vale's score comes first

Football League Third Division South

Results by matchday

Matches

FA Cup

Player statistics

Appearances

Top scorers

Transfers

Transfers in

Transfers out

References
Specific

General

Port Vale F.C. seasons
Port Vale